The 1994 NCAA Division III women's basketball tournament was the 13th annual tournament hosted by the NCAA to determine the national champion of Division III women's collegiate basketball in the United States.

Capital defeated Washington University in St. Louis in the championship game, 82–63, to claim the Crusaders' first Division III national title. 

The championship rounds were hosted by the University of Wisconsin–Eau Claire in Eau Claire, Wisconsin.

Bracket

Final Four

All-tournament team
 Chris Boos, Wisconsin–Eau Claire
 Carmen Ellis, Capital
 Sarah Goldman, Washington University in St. Louis
 Laura Schmelzer, Capital
 Christine Whelan, Wheaton (MA)

See also
 1994 NCAA Division III men's basketball tournament
 1994 NCAA Division I women's basketball tournament
 1994 NCAA Division II women's basketball tournament
 1994 NAIA Division I women's basketball tournament
 1994 NAIA Division II women's basketball tournament

References

 
NCAA Division III women's basketball tournament
1994 in sports in Wisconsin